Cascellius is a genus of beetles in the family Carabidae, containing the following species:

 Cascellius gravesii Curtis, 1839
 Cascellius septentrionalis Roig-Junent, 1995

References

Broscini
Carabidae genera